Thanyathon Sukcharoen formerly known as Thunya Sukcharoen (born 21 April 1997) is a Thai weightlifter. She won the gold medal in the women's 45kg event at the 2021 World Weightlifting Championships in Tashkent, Uzbekistan and the 2022 World Weightlifting Championships in Bogotá, Colombia.

She participated at the 2018 World Weightlifting Championships, winning a medal.

She won the gold medal in the women's 45kg event at the 2021 World Weightlifting Championships held in Tashkent, Uzbekistan.

References

External links

1997 births
Living people
Thanyathon Sukcharoen
Thanyathon Sukcharoen
World Weightlifting Championships medalists
Weightlifters at the 2018 Asian Games
Asian Games medalists in weightlifting
Thanyathon Sukcharoen
Medalists at the 2018 Asian Games
Thanyathon Sukcharoen